Nathuram Mirdha (1921–1996) was a parliamentarian, freedom fighter, social reformer and popular farmer leader of Marwar region in Rajasthan, India. He was born in Kuchera, Nagaur district, Rajasthan on 20 October 1921. His father's name was Thana Ram Mirdha.

Education
Nathuram Mirdha passed his matriculation from Darbar High School Jodhpur with first division with suplimentry. He earned an M.A. (Economics) and completed an LLB degree in 1944 from Lucknow University.

Rise as farmer leader
Nathuram Mirdha organised a massive farmer gathering at Jodhpur under the Chairmanship of Chhotu Ram. He joined the Institution of farmers "Kisan Sabha" founded by Baldev Ram Mirdha as Secretary in 1946. He was made the Revenue minister in the Jodhpur state. Nathuram Mirdha had an intimate association with Justice Kan Singh Parihar.

Freedom fighter and political leader
On 15 August 1947, with the independence of India, a popular Ministry was installed in Jodhpur. Recognising the importance of the Kisan Sabha, Mirda, as its general secretary, was included in the Ministry. He won his first assembly election in 1952 from Merta City constituency with a huge majority. He was a Member of the Rajasthan Legislative Assembly from 1952 to 1967 and 1984 to 1989 and held several important portfolios in the Government of Rajasthan. He is known for strengthening agriculture and cooperative sectors in Rajasthan. Commencing from 1972, he was returned to the Lok Sabha six times.  He served in the Union Council of Ministers in 1979-80 and 1989–90.  He served also as the Chairman of the National Agricultural Prices Commission.

Chairman of National Agricultural Prices Commission

As Chairman of National Agricultural Prices Commission, he implemented a number of schemes in the interest of farmers.

He was Chairman of Maharaja Suraj Mal Institute, New Delhi for ten years.

Family 
He was married to Kesar Devi in 1936 and they had two sons and two daughters.

His younger son Bhanu Prakash Mirdha was elected to the Lok Sabha in 1996. – Senior Farmer's Leader Rajasthan
Richpal Singh Mirdha, Nephew of Nathuram Mirdha – Congress leader Rajasthan
Jyoti Mirdha- Granddaughter of Nathuram Mirdha- Young Congress leader and she was MP from Nagaur in 15th Loksabha

Nathuram Mirdha died on 30 August 1996 in New Delhi, aged 75.

References

Indian independence activists from Rajasthan
1921 births
1996 deaths
People from Nagaur district
University of Lucknow alumni
India MPs 1977–1979
India MPs 1971–1977
India MPs 1980–1984
India MPs 1989–1991
India MPs 1991–1996
India MPs 1996–1997
Lok Sabha members from Rajasthan
Indian social reformers
Nathuram
Indian National Congress politicians
Janata Dal politicians
Indian National Congress (U) politicians